Gus Trikonis (born Kostas Tritchonis; November 21, 1937) is an American actor, dancer, and director.

Career
Trikonis began his career as an actor and dancer, notably appearing in the hugely successful 1961 film West Side Story as Indio, one of the "Sharks", as well as dancing with Debbie Reynolds and Grover Dale to the frantic "He's My Friend" in 1964's  The Unsinkable Molly Brown. Although originally unbilled, on December 3, 1968, Trikonis got his second biggest exposure in front of any audience (the first being in the aforementioned West Side Story, seen at US theatres by about 61 million moviegoers) as one of two main (out of five) male dancers who do Elvis Presley's choreography as he sings a Gospel medley as part of a widely watched NBC-TV Special entitled "Elvis".
 
As a director, Trikonis handled several projects from the late 1960s to the early 1980s, mostly low-budget "exploitation films". He made several films for Roger Corman at New World Pictures; Corman called Trikonis one of the best young directors he had ever worked with.

From the 1980s to the mid-1990s Trikonis mostly directed television series. He directed episodes of television series including Baywatch, Quantum Leap, Hunter, Beauty and the Beast and Wiseguy.

Personal life
Trikonis was married to actress Goldie Hawn from 1969 to 1976; he was her first husband and they have the same birthday. He later married costume designer Barbara Andrews from 1978 till her death in 2012 and they had one child together; a son (Nicolas born in 1981). His sister Gina also appeared in West Side Story as Graziella, Riff's girlfriend, later becoming a costumer and costume/wardrobe supervisor.

Filmography

Director (selection)

Actor

References

External links

1937 births
Living people
Male actors from New York City
American male film actors
American male television actors
Film producers from New York (state)
American male screenwriters
American television directors
Writers from Manhattan
Film directors from New York City
Screenwriters from New York (state)